Artem Yevlyanov (born 18 June 1986) is a Ukrainian football player.

Career
He played for Slovak club Zemplín Michalovce. In his debut for Michalovce he scored a goal in the league match against Slovan Duslo Šaľa. In the 2005–06 season he was Michalovce's top scorer.

References

External links 

 Yevlyanov at Soccerdata.net

1984 births
Living people
Ukrainian footballers
Ukrainian expatriate footballers
Association football midfielders
FC Dnipro players
FC Metalurh Donetsk players
FC Hoverla Uzhhorod players
MFK Zemplín Michalovce players
2. Liga (Slovakia) players
Expatriate footballers in Slovakia
Ukrainian expatriate sportspeople in Slovakia
Footballers from Donetsk